Association des Jeunes Professionnels (AJEPO) was the name of a private technical secondary school founded by Pierre Célestin Munyanshongore in Rwanda. AJEPO (now Nyamata High School) was located in Bugesera District and was the oldest private technical school providing education and training until 1994.

References

Schools in Rwanda